Caphys bilineata is a species of snout moth. It was described by Caspar Stoll in 1781. It is found in much of Central America and South America, including Arizona, Honduras, Panama, Bahamas, Cuba, Grenada, Guadeloupe, Puerto Rico, Saint Vincent, Brazil, Chile, Colombia, Ecuador, Peru, Suriname and Venezuela.

The larvae have been recorded in the nests of the brown-throated parakeet (Aratinga pertinax),  Elaeis oleifera, Elaeis guineensis (Arecaceae), Plinia edulis (Myrtaceae) and Carapa guianensis  and Khaya senegalensis (Meliaceae) and seeds of Araucaria angustifolia (Araucariaceae).

References

Moths described in 1781
Chrysauginae